Paatsalu is a village in Lääneranna Parish, Pärnu County, in southwestern Estonia, on the coast of the Gulf of Riga. It had a population of 73 on 1 January 2011.

The southeastern part of the village is covered by Paadrema Nature Reserve, also part of Nehatu Nature Reserve is located around the Kahvatu Bay.

Lawyer and politician Jaan Teemant (1872–?) was born in Illuste village which is now part of Paatsalu village.

References

External links
Paatsalu holiday centre 

Villages in Pärnu County
Kreis Wiek